The second season of The World God Only Knows, titled The World God Only Knows II, is an anime series based on the manga series of the same name by Tamiki Wakaki. It was produced by Manglobe and directed by Satoshi Ōsedo. One day, out of pride, he accidentally accepts what he assumes to be a challenge for a Bishōjo game when in reality he has accepted a contract from a bumbling demoness named Elsie who asks for his help in capturing runaway spirits from Hell who are hiding in the hearts of girls. The only way to force the spirits out of the girls hearts is by replacing the spirits in the girls' hearts with himself (metaphorically speaking) by making the girls fall in love with him, much to Keima's horror. With the threat of death for both of them should he refuse, Keima has no choice but to help Elsie. Together with his intelligence and knowledge of the dating sim genre and Elsie's magical powers, Keima is about to embark on his greatest challenge. It aired from April 11, 2011 to June 28, 2011.

Three pieces of theme music are used for the second season. The opening theme is titled "A Whole New World God Only Knows" and is performed by Elisa and LIA under the name "Oratorio The World God Only Knows" and the ending theme song is  performed by "The Groove Party God Only Knows" which this time is composed of the second season's voice actresses, Itō, Saori Hayami, Ami Koshimizu, Kana Asumi and Aki Toyosaki. A special version of  performed by Itō and Hayami is used as the ending theme for episodes 16 and 20. For the 24th episode uses the first season's theme song as its ending theme.

Episode list

Notes

References
General
 

Specific

2011 Japanese television seasons
The World God Only Knows